Ahaetulla nasuta, also known as Sri Lankan green vine snake and long-nosed whip snake, is a venomous, slender green tree snake endemic to Sri Lanka.

Distribution 
Due to longstanding confusion over the taxonomy of A. nasuta, the species was once thought to have a large range from Sri Lanka to peninsular India, including the Western Ghats, along with a disjunct population in Southeast Asia. However, a 2020 phylogenetic study found A. nasuta to actually comprise a species complex, with the "true" A. nasuta (from which the species was originally described) being restricted to the wet zone of Sri Lanka (including the Sri Lanka lowland and montane rainforests). 4 populations from the Western Ghats of India that were formerly grouped with A. nasuta were split into the species A. borealis, A. farnsworthi, A. isabellina, and A. malabarica. The large-bodied form from lowland peninsular India (and possibly the dry zone of the northern portion of Sri Lanka), which was also formerly grouped with A. nasuta, was found to actually be A. oxyrhyncha, and is actually more closely allied with A. pulverulenta and A. sahyadrensis than A. nasuta. Finally, the disjunct population in Southeast Asia was assigned to an as-of-yet undescribed species, tentatively referred to as Ahaetulla cf. fusca, and is a sister species to Ahaetulla laudankia.

Description
Common vine snakes are diurnal, arboreal, and mildly venomous.   They normally feed  on frogs and lizards using their binocular vision to hunt.  They are slow moving, relying on camouflaging themselves as vines in foliage.  They expand their bodies when disturbed to show a black and white scale marking.  Also, they may open their mouths in a threat display and point their heads in the direction of the perceived threat. They are the only species of snake with horizontal pupils, compared to the normal vertical slit pupils found in many species of viper.
The species is viviparous, giving birth to young that grow within the body of the mother, enclosed within the egg membrane. They may be capable of delayed fertilization; (parthenogenesis is rare but not unknown in snakes) as a female in the London zoo kept in isolation from August, 1885 gave birth in August, 1888.

Taxonomic description

The species name Ahaetulla in Sinhala means 'eye plucker'. It earned this name, and similar ones in Tamil and Indian vernaculars, due to the mistaken belief that it strikes at the eyes.

The following description with diagnostic characters is from Boulenger (1890):

Formerly treated as a subspecies Ahaetulla nasuta anomala is now regarded as a distinct species, Ahaetulla anomala.

Habitat
Found in low bushes, shrubs and trees in lowland forest terrain at elevations up to about 1000 metres, particularly near streams and often found near human settlements.

Venom and its effects
The ingredients of the venom are unknown. The venom is moderately potent and can cause swelling, pain, bruising, numbness and other local symptoms, which will subside within three days. Bites close to the head, eyes and other vital areas could be severe.

Vernacular names

The Sinhala name "Aheatulla" or "eye-plucker" forms the taxonic species name. In Tamil, it is known as pachai paambu. In Kannada, it is known as Hasiru Haavu.

 Sinhala: ඇහැටුල්ලා (Pronounced: Aheatulla)
 Tamil: பச்சை பாம்பு
 Kannada: ಹಸಿರು ಹಾವು
 Marathi: हरणटोळ (Pronounced: harantol)
 West Bengal: লাউডগা ( Pronounced:Laudoga)

Notes

References 

 Lacepède, B. G. E. 1789 Histoire Naturelle des Quadrupèdes Ovipares et de Serpens. Vol.2. lmprimerie du Roi, Hôtel de Thou, Paris, 671 pp.
 Wall, F. 1908 Remarks on some recently acquired snakes. J. Bombay N. H. S. xviii: 778-784
 Wall 1908 A new color variety of the common green whip-snake (Dryophis mycterizans). J. Bombay N. H. S. xviii: 919
 Wall, F. 1910 Remarks on the varieties and distribution of the common Green Whip Snake (Dryophis mycterizans). J. Bombay nat. Hist. Soc. 20: 229
 Wall 1910 Varieties of the common Green Whip Snake (Dryophis mycterizans). J. Bombay nat. Hist. Soc. 20: 524

nasuta
Snakes of Asia
Reptiles of Sri Lanka
Endemic fauna of Sri Lanka
Reptiles described in 1789
Taxa named by Bernard Germain de Lacépède